Ednilson Pedro Rocha Andrade Mendes (born 25 September 1982), known simply as Ednilson, is a Bissau-Guinean former footballer who played as a defensive midfielder.

Club career
Ednilson was born in Bissau, Guinea-Bissau, moving to Portugal at an early age. Not yet 17, he was bought by Italy's A.S. Roma, but in January 2001 moved to F.C. Alverca for 618 million lire, after he refused to extend his initial contract. Without no official appearances, he was sold to S.L. Benfica.

With the Lisbon club, Ednilson was relatively used during two seasons, after which he was loaned to fellow Primeira Liga sides Vitória S.C. and Gil Vicente FC, playing with the latter precisely as Benfica won the national league after 11 years. After almost two years at OFI Crete (only 17 matches combined) he spent some months without a club, after which he rejoined countryman Almami Moreira at FK Partizan – both were youth graduates at Boavista FC – helping the Belgrade team to the double in his short spell.

Ednilson then played one year in Cyprus with AEK Larnaca FC. On 27 November 2009, he signed a -year contract with FC Dinamo Tbilisi.

On 21 February 2012, Ednilson changed clubs and countries once again, signing for Vasas SC in Budapest for five months. He was released at the end of the campaign (which ended in relegation), with no official appearances to his credit.

Club statistics

International career
After having represented Portugal at U21 level between 2000 and 2003, Ednilson accepted the calls of his country of birth, Guinea-Bissau, when their national team was resurrected in 2010, after three years of inactivity. Ednilson made 3 appearances between 2010 and 2011 for Guinea-Bissau.

References

External links

1982 births
Living people
Sportspeople from Bissau
Bissau-Guinean footballers
Portuguese footballers
Association football midfielders
Serie A players
A.S. Roma players
Primeira Liga players
S.L. Benfica footballers
Vitória S.C. players
Gil Vicente F.C. players
Super League Greece players
OFI Crete F.C. players
Serbian SuperLiga players
FK Partizan players
Cypriot First Division players
AEK Larnaca FC players
Erovnuli Liga players
FC Dinamo Tbilisi players
Vasas SC players
Portugal youth international footballers
Portugal under-21 international footballers
Guinea-Bissau international footballers
Bissau-Guinean expatriate footballers
Portuguese expatriate footballers
Expatriate footballers in Italy
Expatriate footballers in Greece
Expatriate footballers in Serbia
Expatriate footballers in Cyprus
Expatriate footballers in Georgia (country)
Expatriate footballers in Hungary
Bissau-Guinean expatriate sportspeople in Italy
Bissau-Guinean expatriate sportspeople in Greece
Bissau-Guinean expatriate sportspeople in Serbia
Bissau-Guinean expatriate sportspeople in Cyprus
Bissau-Guinean expatriate sportspeople in Georgia (country)
Bissau-Guinean expatriate sportspeople in Hungary